is a railway station on the Kansai Main Line operated by West Japan Railway Company (JR-West) in Minamiyamashiro, Kyoto, Japan.

Lines

Layout
The station has two unnumbered opposed side platforms serving two tracks. Automatic ticket vending machines are not installed, and tickets are only issued by POS terminals.

Platforms

Adjacent stations

History
The station opened on 28 December 1951. With the privatization of Japanese National Railways (JNR) on 1 April 1987, the station came under the control of JR West.

Passenger statistics
According to the Kyoto Prefecture statistical book, the average number of passengers per day is as follows.

Bus services

The station is served by the following bus services.

See also
 List of railway stations in Japan

References

External links
  

Railway stations in Kyoto Prefecture
Stations of West Japan Railway Company
Railway stations in Japan opened in 1951